Oak Hills High School is a four-year public secondary school located in Bridgetown, Ohio, with a mailing address of Cincinnati. Oak Hills often is referred to as "OHHS" by its students and faculty.  It is run by the Oak Hills Local School District.

With approximately 2,500 students enrolled annually, Oak Hills is one of the largest public high schools in Ohio. It is a member of the 10-school Greater Miami Conference.

Athletics

Ohio High School Athletic Association State Championships

 Boys Bowling  -  2004 State Team Champion's
Coed Cheerleading - 2016 OASSA Division I Mount State Champion
 Mock Trial - 1987, 2003, 2007 State Champions
 Boys Baseball – 1980
 Girls Swimming and Diving – 1982
Runner-up
 Boys Soccer – 1980 (lost in double overtime)
Coed Cheerleading - 2015 OASSA Division I Mount State Champion Runner Up

Notable alumni and faculty
 John Bardo, educator, President of Wichita State University, Chancellor of Western Carolina University.
 Rick Charls, former professional high diver who currently holds the record for the world's highest dive at 172 ft.
 Chris Ensminger, professional basketball player and coach
 Susan Floyd, Actress
 Rich Franklin, professional mixed martial arts fighter and former UFC Middleweight champion; former math teacher at Oak Hills
 Scott Klingenbeck, former MLB player for the Cincinnati Reds
 Yoshi Oyakawa (former faculty member/ coach), 1952 Olympic gold medalist in the 100m Backstroke.
 Kim Rhodenbaugh, US Olympic Team, 1984 (swimming). Kim appeared on a Wheaties box in 1989 as part of the product's "Search for Champions II" promotion.
 Pete Rose Jr., former professional baseball player, former manager of the Wichita Wingnuts, son of Pete Rose (not an alumnus)
 Alex Triantafilou, Judge of Hamilton County Court of Common Pleas, Chairman Hamilton County Republican Party
 Bill Wegman, former MLB pitcher for the Milwaukee Brewers
 Brett Wetterich, PGA Tour golfer, winner EDS Byron Nelson Championship (2006)

References

External links
 Oak Hills High School website
 Oak Hills Local School District

High schools in Hamilton County, Ohio
Public high schools in Ohio